The Ethiopian woolly bat (Kerivoula eriophora) is a species of vesper bat in the family Vespertilionidae.
It is found only in Ethiopia.

References

Endemic fauna of Ethiopia
Kerivoulinae
Mammals of Ethiopia
Mammals described in 1877
Bats of Africa
Taxonomy articles created by Polbot
Taxa named by Theodor von Heuglin